The LAE Ultrasport 496T is a Cypriot helicopter that was produced by LAE Helicopters Cyprus of Larnaca.  Now out of production, when it was available the aircraft was supplied complete and ready-to-fly.

The aircraft was reportedly in production in 2015, but by the end of 2017 production had ended in favour of the new LAE Piranha.

Design and development
The Ultrasport 496T is derived from the American Sportscopter Ultrasport 496, replacing the two-stroke powerplant with a turboshaft engine.

The 496T was designed to comply with the European Class 6 microlight helicopter rules. It features a single main rotor and tail rotor, a two-seats-in side-by-side configuration enclosed cockpit with a windshield, skid landing gear and a   Solar T62 turbine engine.

The aircraft fuselage is made from composites. It has a two-bladed main and a ring-mounted tailrotor.

Reviewer Werner Pfaendler, noted that it has "an exceptional power to weight ratio".

Specifications (Ultrasport 496T)

See also
List of rotorcraft

References

Ultrasport
2010s Cypriot sport aircraft
2010s Cypriot ultralight aircraft
2010s Cypriot civil utility aircraft
2010s Cypriot helicopters